Eric Dinowitz (born November 21, 1985) is an American teacher and politician. Dinowitz represents the 11th district of the New York City Council. Dinowitz is a registered Democrat. Dinowitz was elected in a special election held on March 23, 2021, after the resignation of Andrew Cohen, who was elected to the New York Supreme Court. Dinowitz assumed office on April 15, 2021 after weeks of the New York City Board of Elections counting ranked-choice voting ballots which were instituted for municipal elections beginning in 2021.

The 11th district includes Bedford Park, Kingsbridge, Norwood, Riverdale, Van Cortlandt Village, Wakefield, and Woodlawn Heights in The Bronx.

Life and career 
Dinowitz was born in 1985 to New York State Assemblyman Jeffrey Dinowitz and Sylvia Gottlieb in the Northwestern Bronx. He graduated from the Bronx High School of Science and received his bachelor's degree from Binghamton University, SUNY, as well as a master's degree in education from Hunter College, CUNY. Dinowitz spent fifteen years as a special education classroom teacher in the New York City Public Schools. As an active member of his union, the United Federation of Teachers, he served as a chapter leader. Eric is the Democratic District Leader for New York's 81st Assembly District. He served as the Aging Committee Chair of the Bronx Community Board 8.

In 2021, Dinowitz was named to the City & State's Labor 40 Under 40 list.

New York City Council 

 In 2021, Dinowitz was appointed to the following New York City Council committees:
 Chair of the Committee on Veterans
 Committee on Aging
 Committee on Civil Service and Labor
 Committee on Education
 Committee on Mental Health, Disabilities, and Addictions
 Committee on Oversight and Investigations
 Committee on Parks and Recreation
 Committee on Small Business
Dinowitz was also appointed Chairman of the New York City Council Jewish Caucus.

Controversy 
Calls were made for Dinowitz to resign as head of the Jewish caucus following revelations an Anti-Israel activist was named as director of the progressive caucus of which Dinowitz is also a member. Hank Sheinkopf, a former advisor to President Clinton and prominent NYC democrat advisor said "If Dinowitz remains a member of the City Council Progressive Caucus headed by an Israel-hater, he cannot head the Jewish Caucus." Meyer is against aid to Israel and opposes AIPAC.

Music
Dinowitz is a member of New York-based Jewish A cappella group Six13, who have performed worldwide, as well as making an appearance at the White House Hanukkah Party in 2016, hosted by President Barack Obama.

Personal life 
Eric is married to Tamar Dinowitz. They have twin sons, Alex and Jesse.

Electoral history

References 

1985 births
Living people
Jewish American people in New York (state) politics
New York City Council members
New York (state) Democrats
Politicians from the Bronx
21st-century American Jews